The 2019 LFA season was the fourth season of the Liga de Fútbol Americano Profesional, the top American football league in Mexico. The regular season began on February 22 and concluded on April 14. The playoffs commenced on April 26 and concluded on May 12 with the Condors defeating the Raptors to win the Tazón México IV.

Preseason events

Expansion and stadium changes
Two new teams joined the league for the 2019 season: Artilleros Puebla, based in Puebla, and Osos Toluca, based in Toluca, State of Mexico. This expansion raises the number of teams in the league to eight.

During the first LFA season, the Estadio Jesús Martínez "Palillo" hosted all the league's teams. Nevertheless, 2019 will be the first season in which none of the teams would play there, due to the fact that the stadium is now working as shelter for Central American migrants.

Condors was supposed to be the only team playing at the Estadio Jesús Martínez "Palillo", but moved to the ITESM Santa Fe stadium in the district of Santa Fe after Mexico City's government designed the "Palillo" Martínez stadium as a temporary shelter for Central American migrants.

Mayas moved from the "Palillo" Martínez to the Estadio Wilfrido Massieu, which is regularly used by the Instituto Politécnico Nacional Águilas Blancas college football team.

Mexicas also moved from the Estadio Jesús Martínez "Palillo" to the Casco de Santo Tomás, the training ground of the Instituto Politécnico Nacional football teams.

Raptors moved from the Estadio José Ortega Martínez to the field of the National Autonomous University of Mexico Acatlán campus.

Draft
The 2019 Draft was regional, that is, each team chose players graduated from universities in their region. In the case of Artilleros Puebla and Osos Toluca , being unique teams in their region, they had no competition in their player selections. The Draft was held on January 12 at the FES Acatlán facilities . There were nine rounds, 6 normal and 3 complementary. The selections were as follows: 

* Not signed with Condors but with Mexicas.

CFL–LFA draft

In November 2018, the LFA signed a non-binding Letter of Intent with the CFL to share resources and to allow for at least one CFL game to be played in Mexico, as well as lay the ground work for special Mexican-specific editions of the CFL Combine and CFL Draft.

On January 11, 2019, 51 players from the LFA and Mexican college ranks were announced as participants in a combine to beheld on January 13 and a 27-player draft to be held on January 14, 2019. Each CFL team sent scouts and were reported to likely receive four picks.

27 players were chosen from an invited pool of 51 Mexican players: 34 from the LFA and 17 seniors from Mexican university teams.

Teams

Regular season

Standings
Note: GP = Games played, W = Wins, L = Losses, PF = Points for, PA = Points against

Results

Statistical leaders

Playoffs

Playoff bracket

 * Indicates overtime victory

Tazón México IV

The Tazón México IV was held on May 12, 2019 at 3:00 p.m. at the Estadio Azul in Mexico City, with a record attendance for the LFA of 18,000 fans present. The commissioner of the CFL, Randy Ambrossie, was the great guest of the event and together with Alejandro Jaimes, commissioner of the LFA, and Gabriel Soto, they started the fourth edition of the Tazón México. Álex Lora performed the national anthem. The Condors became LFA champions, after beating the Raptors by a score of 20-16 in a somersault game and it was the most cardiac edition in the history of Tazón México, decided in the last 30 seconds of the game. The MVP of the match was Diego Arvizu "El Comandante" (QB) Condors.

Awards 
Following the season, awards are shown the best of the 2019 season.

References

Notes

2019 in American football
LFA
LFA seasons